The Doom novel series is a series of four near-future science fiction novels co-written by Dafydd ab Hugh and Brad Linaweaver; Knee-Deep in the Dead, Hell on Earth, Infernal Sky, and Endgame. The series is initially based on the Doom and Doom II: Hell on Earth first-person shooter video games created by Id Software, although there are multiple departures from the game in the first two novels, and the second two continue in an independent direction to the games' storylines. The novels are primarily written from the first-person perspective of Flynn Taggart, a corporal assigned to Fox Company of United States Marine Corps, although the perspective changes from character to character in the second and third novel.

On February 26, 2008, the series was rebooted and restarted in the vein of Doom 3.  The first book, Worlds on Fire, was written by Matthew Costello, the original writer for Doom 3, and released by Pocket Star Books.  The book stars Special Ops Marine Lieutenant John Kane in the year 2145. The second in the series, Maelstrom, was released on March 31, 2009 and shares the same author and publisher.

Characters

Flynn Taggart

The primary protagonist and narrator of the series, Corporal Flynn "Fly" Taggart is a member of Fox Company, Fifteenth Light Drop Regiment, United States Marine Corps. His serial number is 888-23-9912. He was raised in a  Catholic school, and while not overly religious, believes in and respects the existence of God. He has great mechanical skill, having built a car from spare parts and scrap in his youth, and while not college educated, has considerable street smarts.

Initially to be court-martialled for striking a superior officer, Fly is one of the few people in a position to do anything when Fox is all but wiped out on Phobos. He heads into the base for the sole reason of learning the fate of Arlene Sanders who he has feelings for (albeit not romantic, more akin to brother-sister). He makes his way through Phobos alone, only encountering Arlene when he reaches Deimos.

While on Earth, the teenage Jill Lovelace falls for Fly, although he sees her as an adoptive daughter.

Fly is promoted twice in the novels, first to Sergeant, and later against his wishes to Lieutenant. He is considered the primary expert in fighting the "doom demons".

Arlene Sanders
The secondary protagonist, Private First Class Arlene "A.S." Sanders is also a member of Fox Company, and is Fly's best friend and motivation for entering the Union Aerospace Corporation facility on Phobos after the apparent massacre of Fox Company. She is the only character, apart from Fly, to appear in all four novels. However, she does not exist in the Doom fictional universe beyond the novel. As the videogames only show Fly to be the last remaining human survivor.

A scout with Fox Company, Arlene Sanders was the first woman permitted to join the company, after performing a William Tell routine with the company's Gunnery Sergeant, Goforth. She is in a relationship with another Fox Company marine, Wilhem Dodd, who is reworked into a zombie. She encounters the Dodd zombie while off-Earth. While on Earth, she develops a relationship with Albert Gallatin, and eventually marries him.

Arlene has one brother who was converted to Mormonism, which she believed was a cult. This puts an initial strain on her dealings with the Salt Lake City resistance.  She is a full-blown atheist and seems to enjoy going out of her way to make her lack of beliefs known in a rather facetious manner, mainly towards Fly.

Her connection with Fly is seemingly deep-rooted; after the William Tell incident, he became her first friend in the Marines, and a valuable partner when Phobos and Deimos are invaded. The two have long ago worked through any sexual tensions, having gone through only a drunken kiss during training. They remain fast friends.

Albert Gallatin
An Ex-Marine Sharpshooter and a Mormon, Albert Gallatin is one of the soldiers assisting the Salt Lake City resistance. He is extremely devoted to his faith, but is also a very calm, rational and friendly individual. He is assigned by the Mormon Council of Twelve to assist Fly and Arlene in their mission to Los Angeles, during which the two fall in love. They eventually marry while on the Hyperrealist base, and when he is forced to remain behind while Fly and Arlene attack the Fred base, he returns to Earth and begins to study ways in which he can survive until Arlene finally returns home.

Jill Lovelace
A 14-year-old computer hacker, Jill Lovelace is orphaned when her parents were killed by the invaders. She joins the Salt Lake City resistance, although more to kill demons than to protect the Mormon faith. She is rebellious and sarcastic, but becomes an integral part of the LA mission team. She falls in love with Fly.

She remains with Fly, Arlene, and Albert until they are sent into space to follow a signal transmitted by friendly aliens who had attempted to warn Earth of the impending invasion. Her attempts to return to the Hawaii base fall apart, although it is later revealed that she survived the war, writing a history of Fly and Arlene's adventures (the first two novels) and a treatise on the whole premise between the Hyperrealist-Deconstructionist war. At the end of the fourth novel, Jill exists as an AI within the rebuilt Salt Lake Tabernacle, and a clone which was not woken up within the novels.

Sears and Roebuck
Sears and Roebuck are a Klave pair, members of a binary alien race where everything is encountered in pairs. According to Fly, all Klave appear to be a cross between Alley Oop and Magilla Gorilla. Sears and Roebuck are assigned by the Hyperrealist aliens to help Fly and Arlene in the third and fourth novels. They stick with Fly and Arlene throughout the rest of the series after they are first introduced. Upon returning to Earth Sears and Roebuck leave Fly and Arlene to return to their home planet. This is the last time they are seen.

Plot

Knee-Deep in the Dead
During an operation in the fictional setting Kerfiristan, Flynn Taggart manages to land himself in trouble after attacking Fox Company's commanding officer, Lieutenant Weems (this owing to Weems ordering his troops to fire on what turned out to be religious monks). Before Fly can be court martialled, a distress call is received from the Union Aerospace Corporation facility on Phobos, and he travels with the rest of the company to the Martian moon. Fox Company initially finds the facility abandoned, although they later encounter opposition, which quickly wipes out Fox Company.

Fearing for his best friend, Arlene Sanders, Fly forcibly "convinces" his guards to let him go and begins to make his way through the Phobos facility, encountering all manner of zombies and demons. The fate of Fly's guards is never revealed. He eventually encounters signs that Arlene survived the enemy assault, and begins to actively search for her, eventually leading him to a teleportation device, and then the abandoned Deimos base.

On Deimos, Fly finds Arlene, and the pair of them set forth with the combined goals of escaping and stopping an apparent invasion of Earth. As before, the pair continue through the base, fighting zombies, imps, and pinkie demons. They encounter what they dub a steam demon, and after defeating it, end up teleporting to a new location.

Encountering another living human, Bill Ritch, Fly and Arlene learn that UAC was responsible for activating the "Gate" on Deimos; an artifact left over from a long-vanished alien race. Bill also indicates that there is an "overmind" to the invasion, the spidermind. The trio manage to defeat the spidermind, albeit at the cost of Bill's life. Making their way to the surface of Deimos, Fly and Arlene discover that Deimos had been moved by the demons to Earth's orbit, and that the invasion of Earth was already underway. The pressure dome covering the Deimos facility is slowly leaking oxygen, and the pair will eventually die from oxygen starvation if they do not escape.

Hell on Earth
Building a rocket from spare parts, Fly and Arlene are able to escape from Deimos, although not before experiencing hallucinations due to the oxygen-weak environment. Trusting their lives to fate, the pair launch the spaceship without testing, and manage to survive re-entry, landing several days walk from Salt Lake City.

Arriving in Salt Lake City, Fly and Arlene learn that humanity is no longer the dominant species on earth, and that the United States government is working with the invaders. Salt Lake City is one of a handful of locations holding out against both the demons and the government. Fly and Arlene are taken by Albert Gallatin to meet the head of the resistance, the President of the Church of Jesus Christ of Latter-day Saints. Discovering that, like it or not, they cannot leave the city, Fly and Arlene attempt to contact HQMC, confirming the treachery of the government and alerting them to the Salt Lake City resistance.

Multiple armed forces are sent to Salt Lake City to detain or fight the resistance, including the United States Army, Federal Bureau of Investigation, Bureau of Alcohol, Tobacco, Firearms and Explosives, and the Internal Revenue Service 'revenue collection' strike force. Discovering Fly and Arlene's treachery, the President of the Twelve offers the pair a chance at resolution; lead a strike team to Los Angeles, recover vital information, disable the shields erected around the city, and deliver the information to Hawaii, a resistance stronghold created by the American military. Included on this strike team are Albert Gallatin and Jill Lovelace.

During their trip west, Arlene becomes fond of Albert, despite heavily disagreeing with his religion. Sneaking aboard a westbound train, the four kill a spidermind and a steam demon while attempting to rescue a human hostage. The hostage, Ken, was modified by the invaders to become a cyborg, and is source of the vital information the group must retrieve. The group travel to an airport in Los Angeles, where Albert is wounded by an imp.

Albert, Jill, and Ken find and prepare an aircraft to fly to Hawaii, while Fly and Arlene attempt to take down the energy shield, housed within the Disney Building. They are able to deactivate the shield, but are trapped within the building by a large number of monsters.

Infernal Sky
Having arrived in Hawaii, Fly and Arlene are able to finally relax, but are quickly caught up in an incident involving zombies kept for research. They, along with Albert, are quickly assigned to a new mission: friendly aliens sent a message to Earth just prior to the invasion, and the trio, along with an officer named Esteban Hidalgo, are to travel back to Phobos, and use a Gate to travel to a destination outside the known solar system. Just prior to this briefing, Fly and Arlene are promoted to Sergeant and Lance Corporal respectively.

The three Marines, along with Hidalgo and Jill travel back to California, to reach a spacecraft. The Navy crew are late, but arrive and launch the ship, leaving Jill behind. She begins to make her way back to Hawaii, killing a pair of traitorous humans during her trip. The spacecraft spends a month and a half coasting towards Mars, after which the four Marines are delivered to Phobos. They fight their way to the Gate indicated by the alien's message, and step through.

Arriving at the alien base, later revealed to be beyond the orbit of Pluto, Fly, Arlene, and Albert encounter several alien species, although the only alien to pay any attention to the humans is Sears and Roebuck. The marines learn that humanity is of little interest to most of the aliens; the invasion of earth being of little more than a strategic move during a quiet period in an intergalactic war. This war is fought between two opposing schools of literary thought (hyperrealists and deconstructionists) over eleven pieces of prose left behind by the long deceased alien race responsible for building the Gates. Fly and Arlene also learn that there is no faster than light travel (although travel at velocities close to lightspeed), and that humanity is the only species in the galaxy that 'dies' or has religion.

The party of marines is recruited by Sears and Roebuck to assist on an attack on a Fred base; the Freds being the alien race responsible for the invasion of Earth. Albert is seriously injured during the preparation of the Klave starship. Hidalgo dies due to a teleporter mishap. Fly, Arlene, and Sears and Roebuck quickly complete the mission, but as they cannot return to their vessel. The four are forced to Gate onto a Fred ship, disabling the crew in hand-to-hand combat.

Endgame
Traveling on the captured Fred ship towards the alien's homeworld, Fly attempts to while away the time on the 2 month/200 year journey while dealing with Arlene, who is depressed about not being able to see Albert again, and Sears and Roebuck, who are convinced that they are locked on a suicide mission. Eventually, Fly rallies the group to begin training and preparing for defensive action following the landing on the Fred's homeworld, planning to take as many of the Freds with them as possible.

Arriving on "Fredworld", the quartet find the planet deserted. They learn from reanimating a Fred body that the planet was invaded by the "Newbies", a new race of aliens that learn and evolve at a rapid rate. The marines find a Newbie, who leads them to a planet 120 light years from the Fred homeworld. During the voyage, the captured Newbie attempts to change the ship's course, expending all the braking fuel before he is killed by Fly. Sears and Roebuck are forced to decelerate the 3.7 km ship via friction and air-braking in the planet's atmosphere, during which the stresses on the ship, assisted by a hit from a weapon on the surface, destroy the vessel as it crashes into the planet.

The quartet survive the crash and seek out the weapon, discovering humans. They are captured and taken to a human starship, where Fly and Arlene learn that the war is over, although humanity has become a communistic race, exhibiting extreme amounts of social atomism and an extreme fear of death. The marines discover that the Newbies are infecting the humans, existing at the same level as DNA. Fly figures out that a human with faith in something cannot be "infected", and stages a rebellion on the ship. The rebellion is defeated, Sears and Roebuck are killed, and Fly and Arlene have their souls (or copies of their souls) placed in a computer simulation of Phobos and Deimos.

In the simulation, Fly figures out that the programming is influenced by his memories; by lying to himself, he is able to alter what happened. He collects a force of imps, zombies, and other demons on his quest for Arlene, and they later find a Newbie soul in the program, which, aided by the mind-directed simulation, evolves out of existence. A trapped Fly and Arlene decide they will attempt to remember the invasion as an outright defeat for the Freds, creating a Utopia for themselves; if this works is not revealed in the books. This makeshift army eventually entraps the 'essence' of one of their adversaries, a 'Newbie'. This essence evolves fairly quickly into a form unconcerned with basic reality.

Outside the ship, Fly and Arlene wake up. The "soul-sucking" computer cannot remove human souls completely. Along with their faithful (the humans worshiping Fly) and the bodies of Sears and Roebuck, they escape incineration by the launching human starship. They travel to the destroyed remains of the Fred ship that took them to the planet in the first place, and find an intact and working med-lab. Using this lab, they figure out that it works using symbols. Finding a symbol that looks as close to the Klave as they can, they shove Sears (or Roebuck, they don't know which) into a drawer-like part of the lab and activate the machine, reviving the body of Sears or Roebuck, who then revives his counterpart. After Sears and Roebuck is revived, they find an intact escape pod that was not destroyed in the wreck and use it to get into the orbit of the planet, and take another ship from the planet's artificial moon. They chase after the Newbie-human ship, which is heading for Earth, although on arrival, they discover that the Newbies never arrived, likely having evolved out of existence as well (as affected by the Newbie soul the game-force had captured). Landing at a rebuilt Salt Lake City (which was destroyed by nuclear weapons in the third novel), Fly and Arlene head to the Tabernacle to find out what happened to Jill and Albert. The pair encounter an AI and a clone of Jill, and a black box with a glowing light simply labeled as "Albert", which presumably contains his intellect (Fly and Arlene discover that Albert spent many years researching a way to extend the human lifespan so that he would be able to see Arlene again).

Differences

There are a number of notable differences between the games and the novels.
	 		 	
 In the games the Doomguy has no name. id Software's unused design document, The Doom Bible, suggested several different names for the main protagonist, including: Lorelei Chen, John "Petro" Pietrovich, Dimitri Paramo, and Thi Barrett.
 The demons are creatures genetically engineered by the Freds, and are not actual demons from hell. In addition, the Marines do not travel to an actual Hell at any point in the novels.
 The background of the series is that of an intergalactic war fought at sublight speeds, of which Earth is the site of an almost insignificant conflict.
 In the game, Doomguy can carry 50 rockets, in spite of them being quite large. In the books, the rockets that Fly picks up as ammo for his personal rocket launcher are the size of small batteries, allowing him to feasibly carry 50 of them.
 In the first book, Fly personally encounters and uses all of the weapons and items featured in the Doom game, but the first book also takes liberties by introducing additional weaponry, such as various types of rifles and pistols. Fly's weapon of choice through much of the novel is a "Sig-Cow" rifle.
 In the game, imps (also referred to by the name 'spiny' in the novels) are demonic and are able to conjure fire from their hands to use as missile weapons. In keeping with the book's more science fiction theme, the imps in the book possess a napalm-type mucus that they spit into their hands and throw. Much later, Universal Pictures would use a similar attack by having their Imps spit their sharp tongues out at victims like a poisonous dart to infect them in the 2005 film, which is speculated to be based on the books rather than the games due to the theme of genetic experimentation and the lack of a "Hell" element.
 Likewise, the Barons of Hell (called 'Hell Princes' in the book), large minotaur-like goatmen, conjure green flames with their hands to hurl at the player, while the book describes them as using wrist-mounted plasma launchers.
 In the game, Lost Souls are most likely just that; souls damned for eternity, appearing as flying, horned, flaming skulls. In the book (in which they are named 'Flying Skulls'), to keep with the science fiction theme, they are instead mechanical skulls with rocket engines attached to them, which is actually closer to the original design of the beta versions of Doom.

Notes

References

 
Military science fiction novels
Mormonism in fiction
Science fiction novel series